Reardon is an unincorporated community in Jersey County, Illinois, United States.

It was the terminus of a branch of the Alton Railroad which ran from Carrollton.

References

Unincorporated communities in Illinois
Unincorporated communities in Jersey County, Illinois